This is a list of Kazakh football transfers in the winter transfer window 2020 by club. Only clubs of the 2021 Kazakhstan Premier League are included.

Kazakhstan Premier League 2021

Aktobe

In:

Out:

Akzhayik

In:

Out:

Astana

In:

Out:

Atyrau

In:

Out:

Caspiy

In:

Out:

Kairat

In:

Out:

Kaisar

In:

Out:

Kyzylzhar

In:

Out:

Ordabasy

In:

Out:

Shakhter Karagandy

In:

Out:

Taraz

In:

Out:

Tobol

In:

Out:

Turan

In:

Out:

Zhetysu

In:

Out:

References

Kazakhstan
2020-21
Transfers